The Father William Duncan House, also known as the Father Duncan Cottage and now hosting the Duncan Cottage Museum, is a historic house located at 501 Tait Street in Metlakatla, Alaska.  The single-story wood-frame structure was built in 1891 by the Tsimshian followers of the Anglican missionary William Duncan.  It was one of the first structures built in Metlakatla after Duncan led a small number of followers there from the like-named village in British Columbia.  The front facade is faced in shiplap siding, with four evenly spaced pilasters.  There is decorative woodwork in the shallow-pitch gable end.  Duncan was an influential leader of the community until his death in 1918.

The house was listed on the National Register of Historic Places in 1972.

See also
National Register of Historic Places listings in Prince of Wales–Hyder Census Area, Alaska

References

External links

Duncan Cottage Museum website

Anglicanism in the United States
Houses completed in 1891
Houses in Unorganized Borough, Alaska
Houses on the National Register of Historic Places in Alaska
Buildings and structures on the National Register of Historic Places in Prince of Wales–Hyder Census Area, Alaska
Native American history of Alaska
Pre-statehood history of Alaska